Victory is the eleventh studio album by German duo Modern Talking, released on 18 March 2002 by Hansa Records. Two singles were released from the album, "Ready for the Victory" and "Juliet", which charted at numbers seven and 25 in Germany, respectively. Victory debuted at number one on the German Albums Chart on 1 April 2002, spending four weeks within the top 10 and 15 weeks altogether on chart. The album has been certified gold by the Bundesverband Musikindustrie (BVMI), denoting shipments in excess of 150,000 units in Germany.

Track listing

Personnel
 Dieter Bohlen – production
 Axel Breitung – co-production, arrangements 
 Thorsten Brötzmann – co-production, arrangements 
 Lalo Titenkov – co-production, arrangements 
 Kay M. Nickold – co-production, arrangements 
 Werner Becker – co-production, arrangements 
 Manfred Esser – photos
 Stephan Pick – photos
 Ronald Reinsberg – artwork

Charts

Weekly charts

Year-end charts

Certifications

References

2002 albums
Hansa Records albums
Modern Talking albums